Bathyomphalus is a genus of small air-breathing freshwater snails, aquatic pulmonate gastropod mollusks in the family Planorbidae, the ramshorn snails and their allies.

Species
Species within this genus include:
 Bathyomphalus contortus Linnaeus, 1758 - type species

References

External links 
 AnimalBase info at: 

Planorbidae

no:Remskivesnegl